Darrell Charles Schweitzer (born August 27, 1952) is an American writer, editor, and critic in the field of speculative fiction. Much of his focus has been on dark fantasy and horror, although he does also work in science fiction and fantasy.  Schweitzer is also a prolific writer of literary criticism and editor of collections of essays on various writers within his preferred genres.

Life and career
Schweitzer was born in Woodbury, New Jersey, son of Francis Edward and Mary Alice Schweitzer. He attended Villanova University from 1970 to 1976, from which he received a B.S. in geography (1974) and an M.A. in English (1976). He started his literary career as a reviewer and columnist. He worked as an editorial assistant for Isaac Asimov's SF Magazine from 1977 to 1982 and Amazing Stories from 1982 to 1986, was co-editor with George H. Scithers and John Gregory Betancourt of Weird Tales from 1987 to 1990 and sole editor of the same magazine from 1991 to 1994 and its successor, Worlds of Fantasy & Horror, from 1994 to 1996. From 1998 to 2007 he was again co-editor of the revived Weird Tales, first with Scithers and then with Scithers and Betancourt. He has also been a part-time literary agent for the Owlswick Agency in Philadelphia. and a World Fantasy Award judge. He is a member of Science Fiction Writers of America and Horror Writers of America. He lives and works in the Philadelphia area.

Fiction
Most of Schweitzer's fiction is in the areas of dark fantasy and horror. He works most frequently in fiction of shorter lengths, though he has also written a number of novels. His first, The White Isle, an epic, disillusioning quest to the underworld, was written in 1976 but remained unpublished until 1989. The Shattered Goddess (1982) takes place in a far future "Dying Earth" setting, which he later revisited for a sequence of short stories collected as Echoes of the Goddess (2013).

The first work in his tales of the world of the Great River focusing on child-sorcerer Sekenre, "To Become a Sorcerer" (1991), was nominated for the 1992 World Fantasy Award for Best Novella and later expanded into the novel The Mask of the Sorcerer (1995). Additional stories in the series have been collected in Sekenre: The Book of the Sorcerer (2004).

His latest novel, The Dragon House (2018), melds his customary dark tone with elements of humor in a lighter work for young adults. Other works include his stories of the lapsed knight Julian, most collected in We Are All Legends (1981), his tales of legendary madman Tom O'Bedlam, numerous works using H. P. Lovecraft's Cthulhu Mythos, many collected in Awaiting Strange Gods: Weird and Lovecraftian Fictions (2015), and a large body of unconnected short stories.

Nonfiction
Schweitzer is an authority on the history of speculative fiction and has written numerous critical and bibliographical works on both the field in general and such writers as Lord Dunsany, H. P. Lovecraft, and Robert E. Howard. Many of his essays, reviews and author interviews have been collected into book form. He has also edited a number of anthologies and short story collections.

Awards
Together with his editorial colleagues Schweitzer won the 1992 World Fantasy Award special award in the professional category for Weird Tales. His poem Remembering the Future won the 2006 Asimov's Science Fictions Readers' Award for best poem.

Bibliography

References

Further reading
 Steve Behrends. "Holy Fire: Darrell Schweitzer's Imaginative Fiction". Studies in Weird Fiction 5 (Spring 1989): 3–11.

External links
 "Dreamer on the wildside" – 2004 interview by Cold Print magazine
 "Spotlight on Darrell Schweitzer" – 2007 interview by Portal Press Books
 

1952 births
20th-century American male writers
20th-century American non-fiction writers
20th-century American novelists
20th-century American poets
20th-century American short story writers
21st-century American male writers
21st-century American non-fiction writers
21st-century American poets
21st-century American short story writers
American fantasy writers
American horror writers
American male non-fiction writers
American male novelists
American male poets
American male short story writers
American science fiction writers
American speculative fiction critics
American speculative fiction editors
H. P. Lovecraft scholars
Living people
Science fiction critics
Science fiction editors
Weird fiction writers
Weird Tales editors